Villereau is the name of the following communes in France:

 Villereau, Loiret, in the Loiret department
 Villereau, Nord, in the Nord department